The 2023 Welsh Open (officially the 2023 BetVictor Welsh Open) was a professional snooker tournament that took place from 13 to 19 February 2023 at Venue Cymru in Llandudno, Wales, marking the first time since the event's inception in 1992 that it was staged elsewhere than Newport or Cardiff. Qualifiers took place from 11 to 13 January 2023 at the Metrodome in Barnsley, although matches involving the top 16 players in the world rankings, as well as matches involving two Welsh wild-card entrants, were held over and played at the final venue. Organised by the World Snooker Tour and sponsored by online betting company BetVictor, the tournament was broadcast by BBC Cymru Wales and the BBC Red Button domestically, by Eurosport in Europe, and by multiple other broadcasters internationally. The winner received £80,000 from a total prize fund of £427,000.

The 11th ranking event of the 2022–23 season, the Welsh Open was the fourth and final tournament in the season's Home Nations Series, following the Northern Ireland Open, the Scottish Open, and the English Open. It was also the final tournament in the season's BetVictor Series, which carried a  £150,000 bonus for the player who won the most cumulative prize money across its eight events. Matches were played as the best of seven frames until the quarter-finals, which were the best of nine frames. The semi-finals were the best of 11 frames and the final was the best of 17 frames.  

Joe Perry was the defending champion, having defeated Judd Trump 9–5 in the 2022 final, but he lost 1–4 to Robbie Williams in the last 32. Robert Milkins defeated Shaun Murphy 9–7 in the final to win his second ranking title, and also secured the BetVictor Series bonus, having won cumulative prize money of £127,000 across the eight tournaments. He advanced from 27th to 16th place in the world rankings after the event.

The event's main stage produced a total of 48 century breaks. Murphy made back-to-back breaks of 145 and 147, the highest of the tournament, in the second and third frames of his last-16 match against Daniel Wells. The 147 was Murphy's seventh maximum break in professional competition.

Prize fund
The breakdown of prize money for this event is shown below:
 Winner: £80,000
 Runner-up: £35,000
 Semi-final: £17,500
 Quarter-final: £11,000
 Last 16: £7,500
 Last 32: £4,500
 Last 64: £3,000
 Highest break: £5,000
 Total: £427,000

Main draw

Top half

Bottom half

Final

Qualifying 
Qualification for the tournament took place from 11 to 13 January 2023 at the Metrodome in Barnsley, England.

Main qualifying 

  0–4 
  2–4 
  (16) 3–4 
  1–4 
  3–4 
  (23) 1–4 
  4–3 
  4–0 
  (24) 4–1 
  0–4 
  1–4 
  (27) 4–2 
  4–2 
  4–1 
  (20) 4–3 
  1–4 
  4–3 
  (19) 4–2 
  4–2 
  1–4 
  (28) 4–1 
  1–4 
  4–0 
  (30) 4–2 
  4–3 
  0–4 
  4–3 
  4–1 
  (21) 4–0 
  4–0 
  4–2 
  (26) 0–4 
  1–4 
  2–4 
  (25) 3–4 
  4–2 
  4–0 
  (22) 4–2 
  3–4 
  1–4 
  0–4 
  4–1 
  (30) 2–4 
  1–4

Held-over matches
Matches involving the top 16 seeds and the nominated wild-card players were played at the Venue Cymru. Due to David Gilbert and Hossein Vafaei being late replacements for the 2023 Masters, their matches were also held-over, due to clashing with the scheduled qualifying slot.

  (1) 4–0 
  (31) 3–4 
  1–4 
  (15) 3–4 
  (9) 4–1 
  (8) 4–2 
  (5) 4–0 
  (11) 4–0 
  (12) 4–0 
  (4) 4–1 
  (3) 4–2 
  (13) 4–1 
  (18) 4–2 
  (10) 4–1 
  (6) 4–1 
  (7) 4–0 
  1–4 
  (14) 1–4 
  (17) 4–2 
  (2) 4–0

Century breaks

Main stage centuries 
A total of 48 century breaks were made during the main event.

 147, 145, 134, 114, 102, 100  Shaun Murphy
 142, 113, 110  David Gilbert
 138  Jack Lisowski
 137, 115, 109  Robert Milkins
 135, 112, 101  John Higgins
 134, 114  David Lilley
 133, 102, 100  Hossein Vafaei
 133  Marco Fu
 131, 105  Jackson Page
 130  Ben Mertens
 129  Neil Robertson
 125, 116  Robbie Williams
 124, 124  Mark Selby
 124  Ali Carter
 124  Pang Junxu
 122  Mark Williams
 122  Liam Davies
 114  Sanderson Lam
 108, 100  Ronnie O'Sullivan
 108  Joe O'Connor
 107  Joe Perry
 105, 101  Mark Allen
 105  Si Jiahui
 104  Asjad Iqbal
 102  Andy Lee
 102  Wu Yize
 101  Daniel Wells
 100  Luca Brecel
 100  Yuan Sijun

Qualifying stage centuries 
A total of 14 century breaks were made during qualification.

 142  Elliot Slessor
 139  Stephen Maguire
 138, 108  Ricky Walden
 136  Ben Woollaston
 127  Sam Craigie
 117  Martin Gould
 112  Scott Donaldson
 105  Jak Jones
 104  Andrew Pagett
 102  Mitchell Mann
 102  Daniel Wells
 100  Steven Hallworth
 100  Fergal O'Brien

References

Home Nations Series
2023
2023 in snooker
2023 in Welsh sport
February 2023 sports events in the United Kingdom
European Series
2023 Welsh Open